L.A.B. IV is the fourth studio album by Whakatāne, New Zealand reggae band L.A.B. It was released on 18 December 2020 via Loop Recordings Aot(ear)oa as a sequel to their 2019 album L.A.B. III. The album debuted at number one in New Zealand and number forty-five in Australia. It features two singles: "My Brother" and "Why Oh Why", which were also charted at number 35 and 1 respectively. "Why Oh Why" became the band's second number-one single after "In the Air" (2019).

Track listing

Charts

Weekly charts

Year-end charts

Certifications

See also 
 List of number-one albums from the 2020s (New Zealand)

References 

2020 albums
L.A.B. albums